Marcos Paullo Barcelos Peixoto (born March 28, 1990), known as just Marcos Paullo, is a Brazilian footballer.

Club career

Brazil
Marcos Paullo began his career in the youth ranks of Goiás EC. He started his career as a left back but his attacking skills led to him being converted to an attacking midfielder, playing primarily as a left winger. He began to impress with the Goiás Under-17 side. In 2008, he moved up to the Under-18 side and helped Goiás capture the Campeonato Goiano Sub-18, scoring his club's second goal in a 3-1 victory over local rival Vila Nova. In 2009, he moved up the Under-20 side and played in the Campeonato Brasileiro Sub-20 and the Copa São Paulo de Juniores. In 2010, he joined Curitiba side Atletico Paranaense and played for their Under-20 side.

United States
During July 2010 he went on trial with New York Red Bulls in hopes of joining the club. He made an appearance in a friendly for New York on July 25, 2010, as a second-half substitute in a 2-1 victory over Manchester City. On February 2, 2011 it was announced that he had signed with New York Red Bulls. On June 28, 2011 Paullo made his first team debut for New York playing the full 90 in a 2-1 victory over FC New York in the US Open Cup.

Paullo was waived by New York on November 23, 2011.

References

External links
Sports21.com.br Profile

1990 births
Living people
Brazilian footballers
New York Red Bulls players
Association football midfielders
Sportspeople from Goiás